Mutantes is the second album by the Brazilian tropicalia band Os Mutantes. The album was originally released in 1969 (see 1969 in music) and reissued in 1999 on Omplatten Records and again in 2006 by Omplatten's (and Polydor's) parent company, Universal Records. It shows a more polished approach than their first album, maintaining the sense of humour while keeping the experimental aspects, such as fusing different genres, studio trickery as well as using found objects and samples from television and movies.

It was listed by Rolling Stone Brazil at #44 on the 100 best Brazilian albums in history list. One of its singles, "2001", was also voted by the magazine as the 90th greatest Brazilian song.

Track listing

Personnel
Os Mutantes
 Arnaldo Baptista: vocals (tracks 1, 2, 3, 4, 5, 9, 10, 11), bass and keyboards
 Rita Lee: vocals (tracks 1, 2, 4, 5, 6, 7, 9, 11), percussion, theremin, autoharp, recorder
 Sérgio Dias: guitars, vocals (1, 2, 5, 8, 9, 11) and bass; drums in "Fuga Nº II dos Mutantes"

with:

 Dinho Leme (credited as "Sir Ronaldo I Du Rancharia"): Drums
 Zé do Rancho & Mariazinha - (respectively) Viola caipira (Brazilian country acoustic guitar) and accordion; vocals on track 4
 Cláudio César Dias Baptista (simply credited as "Claudio") - electronics construction (Regulus guitar [Golden Guitar])
 Rogério Duprat: Orchestral arrangements

References

1969 albums
Os Mutantes albums
Polydor Records albums
Música Popular Brasileira albums
Portuguese-language albums